Inferior hemorrhoidal can refer to:

 Inferior anal nerves
 Inferior rectal artery
 Inferior rectal veins